The Globe class is a series of 5 container ships built for China Shipping Container Lines and later operated by COSCO SHIPPING Lines. The ships have a maximum theoretical capacity of 18,982 TEU. The ships were built by Hyundai Heavy Industries at their shipyard in Ulsan, South Korea. The first ship, the CSCL Globe, was delivered on 18 November 2014. At the time she was the largest container ship in the world.

List of ships

See also 

 Star-class container ship

References 

Container ship classes
Ships built by Hyundai Heavy Industries Group
Ships of COSCO Shipping